Coptocercus is a genus of beetles in the family Cerambycidae, mainly found in Eucalypts.

Species 
The following species are accepted within Coptocercus:

 Coptocercus abberrans (Newman, 1840)
 Coptocercus aruensis Wang, 1995
 Coptocercus assimilis (Hope, 1841)
 Coptocercus australis Wang, 1995
 Coptocercus biguttatus (Donovan, 1805)
 Coptocercus clarus Wang, 1995
 Coptocercus crucigerus (Hope, 1842)
 Coptocercus galachrous Wang, 1995
 Coptocercus javanicus Wang, 1995
 Coptocercus matthewsi Wang, 1995
 Coptocercus multitrichus Wang, 1995
 Coptocercus mutabilis Gressitt, 1959
 Coptocercus nigritulus Blackburn, 1889
 Coptocercus orientalis Wang, 1995
 Coptocercus ovaliguttatus Wang, 1995
 Coptocercus papuanus Heller, 1914
 Coptocercus pascoei Wang, 1995
 Coptocercus pedator (Pascoe, 1864)
 Coptocercus pretiosus Wang, 1995
 Coptocercus pubescens (Pascoe, 1863)
 Coptocercus quatuordecimsignatus Schwarzer, 1926
 Coptocercus robustus Wang, 1995
 Coptocercus rotundiguttatus Wang, 1995
 Coptocercus rubripes (Boisduval, 1835)
 Coptocercus rugicollis Aurivillius, 1917
 Coptocercus schneiderae Wang, 1995
 Coptocercus scripticollis Carter, 1930
 Coptocercus shuteae Wang, 1995
 Coptocercus spinithoracicus Wang, 1995
 Coptocercus sulciscapus Wang, 1995
 Coptocercus terminalis Wang, 1995
 Coptocercus tricolor Wang, 1995
 Coptocercus trimaculatus (Hope, 1841)
 Coptocercus truncatus Aurivillius, 1917
 Coptocercus undulatus (Hope, 1841)
 Coptocercus validus Gahan, 1893
 Coptocercus vicinus (Hope, 1842)
 Coptocercus walkeri Wang, 1995
 Coptocercus weiri Wang, 1995

References 

Elaphidiini